Original 106 is a radio station owned by DC Thomson and broadcasting to Aberdeen and Aberdeenshire. It was initially owned by Canadian media company Canwest, and was awarded its broadcast licence (the last new commercial FM licence to be issued by Ofcom) in January 2007 and the station launched on 28 October 2007 at 1:06 pm, when the first record played was "Revolution" by The Beatles. 
On 12 September 2009 the station was sold to a consortium led by Adam Findlay which included John Quinn and Murray Strachan. Adam Findlay's New Wave Media owned Dundee radio station Wave 102, John Quinn is the majority shareholder and chairman of Central FM, a station which covers the Forth Valley in the Central Belt.
On 20 March 2019 it was announced that the publisher DC Thomson, which already owned Wave FM in Dundee, had bought the Fife-based Kingdom FM and Original 106 taking its tally of radio stations to three.

Since its launch until June 2019, Original 106 operated from studios at Craigshaw Business Park in West Tullos, Aberdeen. On 25 June 2019 the station relocated to a new studio complex within Marischal Square, Aberdeen. Three FM transmitters are in operation; Durris near Stonehaven on 106.8 covering all north-east Scotland, a relay on 106.3 for Peterhead and Buchan which was added to the network on 8 May 2014 and a relay at Balgownie (also on 106.3FM) covering north Aberdeen which was added on the 28 November 2018. With transmissions commencing on 26 June 2019, Original 106 is now available across the north east of Scotland on DAB (Digital Audio Broadcasting) via the Switch Aberdeen multiplex, and a UK-wide internet audio stream is available from the station website, on smart speakers and on mobile app.

On 1 December 2016 three supplementary online-only stations were launched under the Original 106 brand; Original 106 Chart, Original 106 Country, and Original 106 Gold (non-stop 60's, 70's & 80s hits). The chart and country stations were replaced by party and rock themed stations respectively in 2020, all are accessible from the station website, smart speakers and downloadable app.

As of December 2022, the station broadcasts to a weekly audience of 63,000, according to RAJAR.

Music
In July 2018, permission was granted by Ofcom for Original 106 to adjust its music format by removing the requirement to play exclusively alternative, rock oriented tracks and widen its appeal to playing a broad range of hit music from a full range of popular genres including rock, pop, soul, dance. The focus is on hits from the 80s to the present day, plus a selection of 70s classics.

Output
The programming output of Original 106 is produced and generated from within its transmission area during weekday daytime hours. There are hourly round-the-clock news bulletins covering local, national and international news. Locally produced bulletins are augmented by overnight national bulletins from Sky News.

Current weekday presenters are Claire Stevenson and Craig McDonald (Breakfast), Martin Ingram (Daytime), Martyn Smith (Drivetime), and Gemma McLean (evenings). Weekend presenters include Vanessa Motion, Dave Connor, Lachlan McKenzie & Beth Milne.

During traffic peak times there is travel news, sports and business updates, plus energy updates relevant to the North-East's oil, gas and renewables sectors.

Entertainment 'what's on' guides are broadcast daily, plus interviews and personalities from news and entertainment backgrounds, film/theatre reviews etc form a significant part of speech output.

Original 106 associates itself with a range of local charities including Friends Of Anchor, Children 1st, VSA (Voluntary Services Aberdeen), CFINE - Community Food Initiatives North East, Instant Neighbour, and Charlie House with the aim of publicising their work and assisting in fundraising efforts. Original's annual Christmas appeal seeks donations of non-perishable foods to stock local food banks.
In both 2012 and 2013, the station hosted 24 hour marathon broadcasts in aid of the STV Appeal.

In 2016, Original 106 was nominated in two categories at the Arqiva Commercial Radio Awards; in the "Station of the Year" and "Social Action Initiative" categories.

Online
The Original 106 website features local news and weather updates, and an audio stream. Audio and podcasts also feature. Original 106 has mobile apps available to download for both IOS and Android devices.

On 1 December 2016 three online-only stations were launched under the Original 106 brand; Original 106 Chart (playing non-stop current and recent hits), Original 106 Country (current and classic country hits) and Original 106 Gold (non-stop 60s, 70s and 80s hits). In 2020, the chart station was replaced by Original 106 Party, and the country station was replaced by Original 106 Rocks. Original 106 Gold, Rocks and Party are all accessible from the station website, smart speakers and downloadable app.

References

External links
 Official web site for Original 106

Radio stations in Aberdeen
Radio stations in Scotland
Radio stations established in 2007